Gettin' Together is a 1960 jazz album by saxophonist Art Pepper playing with Conte Candoli, Wynton Kelly, Paul Chambers, and Jimmy Cobb.

The liner notes by Martin Williams describe the album as 'a sort of sequel to the earlier Art Pepper Meets the Rhythm Section, which also featured the Miles Davis rhythm section of its time.

Track listing
"Whims of Chambers" (Paul Chambers) – 6:56
"Bijou the Poodle" (Art Pepper) – 5:48
"Why Are We Afraid" (Dory Langdon; André Previn) – 3:36
"Softly, as in a Morning Sunrise" (Sigmund Romberg; Oscar Hammerstein II) – 6:55
"Rhythm-a-Ning" (Thelonious Monk) – 7:15
"Diane" (Art Pepper) – 5:03
"Gettin' Together" (Art Pepper) – 7 :50
(Recorded on 29 February 1960.)

Personnel
Art Pepper – alto saxophone; tenor saxophone
Conte Candoli – trumpet
Wynton Kelly – piano
Paul Chambers – bass
Jimmy Cobb – drums

References

1960 albums
Art Pepper albums
Contemporary Records albums
Original Jazz Classics albums